J. B. Carroll may refer to:

Joe Barry Carroll (born 1958), American basketball player
John Bissell Carroll (1916–2003), American psychologist

See also
Carroll (surname)